, is a cluster of five volcanic lakes situated at the foot of Mount Bandai in the center of the lake district of Bandai-kōgen, Kitashiobara, Fukushima, Japan.

Goshiki-numa formed when Mount Bandai erupted on July 15, 1888, destroying dozens of villages and killing approximately 500 people while creating hundreds of lakes and tarns.

The eruption completely rearranged the landscape, creating the Bandai-kōgen plateau and damming local rivers. The eruption imparted mineral deposits to the Five Colored Lakes giving each of them their own delicate color, ranging from reddish green to cobalt blue. The colors of each lake mysteriously fluctuate throughout the year with the weather. Since the eruption, Goshiki-numa has become a popular tourist destination. An approximately four-kilometer walking path from Lake Bishamon, the largest of the five lakes, to Lake Hibara affords people a view of all five lakes.

Gallery

Notes

References

External links

 Japan National Tourist Organization information

Lakes of Japan
Tourist attractions in Fukushima Prefecture
Landforms of Fukushima Prefecture
Kitashiobara, Fukushima